Las Vega's is a Colombian comedy drama television series produced by Silvia Durán for RCN Televisión. It is an adaptation of the Chilean telenovela of the same name, and premiered on 26 October 2016, and concluded on 10 February 2017. The series stars an ensemble cast, starting with the singer Greeicy Rendón, Natalia Ramírez, Elizabeth Minotta, and Camila Zárate, along to the male cast; starting with Tiberio Cruz, Santiago Alarcón, Luis Alfredo Velasco, and Juan Alfonso Baptista.

The series revolves around of the Vega Díaz family, who live happily until the family's patriarch suddenly dies, leaving his wife and three daughters Mariana, Antonia and Camila in total bankruptcy. After the sad news they received, the four women will discover that their family's patriarch had a dedicated nightclub for men. And thanks to this nightclub they have the brilliant idea of turning it into a women's-only club, and for this they hire 4 strippers, who will become more than just employees for them.

The first episode of the series premiered with a total of 8.6 million viewers, becoming the third most watched programs nationwide in Colombia. Despite having premiered with a good average, he failed to overcome the expectations of the network, and received negative reviews from the Colombian audience; who did not receive the series in a good way for "showing naked men" at a schedule when there are still children awake. The final episode of the series ranked fifth as the least watched show with a total of 6.9 million viewers.

Cast

Main 
 Natalia Ramírez as Verónica María Bolaños de Vega
 Santiago Alarcón as Mauricio Reyna
 Alejandro Martínez as Álvaro Sandoval
 Juan Alfonso Baptista as Vicente Correa
 Greeicy Rendón as Camila Eugenia Vega Bolaños
 Camila Zárate as Antonia Vega Bolaños
 Elizabeth Minotta as Mariana de los Ángeles Vega Bolaños
 Luis Alfredo Velasco as José Luis "Coto" Rodríguez
 Tiberio Cruz as Pedro Vargas
  as Robinson Garzón
 Carlos Manuel Vesga as Germán de Jesús Ordóñez Prieto
 Juan Manuel Restrepo as Kenny Marín
 Marcela Valencia as Rocío
 Diana Mendoza as Jesica Mejía
 Carlos Hurtado as Carlos Vega
 Gustavo Ángel as Concejal Javier Morales
 Biassini Segura as Carlos "Carlitos" Vega
 Julián Caicedo as Benjamín Orozco
 Javier Gardeazábal as Renzo Sandoval
 Cindy Yacamán as María José Duarte
 Mónica Uribe as Natalia de Vargas
 Juan Pablo Manzanera as Antonio "Toñito" Orozco Vega
 Alberto León Jaramillo as Lorenzo

Recurring 
 Mónica Pardo as Natalia
 Luly Bossa as Yolanda Lozano de Sandoval
 Estefany Escobar as Lorena Cecilia Morales
 Jorge Monterrosa as Macardo Figueroa
 Manuel Busquets as Correa
 Giancarlo Mendoza as Javier

Awards and nominations

References

External links 
 

Colombian telenovelas
2016 Colombian television series debuts
2017 Colombian television series endings
Spanish-language television shows
Spanish-language telenovelas
RCN Televisión telenovelas
Television series about families
2016 telenovelas